Jahan Ara is the 1964 Indian Hindi debut film of director Vinod Kumar. It stars Prithviraj Kapoor, Bharat Bhushan, Mala Sinha, Shashikala in lead roles. The film is a historical romance based on the life of Jahanara Begum, played by Mala Sinha. It was the first time this character was portrayed on-screen.

The movie did not do well at the box office.

Plot
Mirza Yusuf Changezi (Bharat Bhushan) and Jahan Ara (Mala Sinha) have been good friends since childhood. Things are not quite the same as they grow up, as Jahan Ara's father is none other than Emperor Shah Jahan, and men are not permitted to meet with the princess under any circumstances. However, Jahan and Mirza do meet secretly and promise to marry each other. Misfortune visits the emperor, when his wife, Mumtaz Mahal (Achala Sachdev), passes away. The emperor gets deeply devastated, and, still mourning his wife's death, he pledges to build a memorial in her name (which would subsequently be called Taj Mahal, one of the seven wonders on Earth). At her deathbed, Mumtaz makes Jahan promise that she will take care of her father, which she promises to do. This responsibility makes her sacrifice her love for Mirza, who is heartbroken and continues to believe that Jahan will sooner or later reunite with him.

Cast
 Prithviraj Kapoor as Shah Jahan
 Bharat Bhushan as Mirza Yusuf Changezi
 Mala Sinha as Jahan Ara
 Shashikala as Karuna
 Om Prakash
 Achala Sachdev as Mumtaz Mahal
 Sunder as  Gulley
 Aruna Irani
 Minoo Mumtaz as Roshan Ara
 Baby Farida

Awards
 Nominated: Filmfare Award for Best Actress (1965), Mala Sinha
 Filmfare Award for Best Art Direction (Color) - Sant Singh

Music

The soundtrack of the film contains songs composed by Madan Mohan, while the lyrics are by Rajinder Krishan. The songs of the film became popular and still remain so. The album also made an attempt of reviving singing career of Talat Mahmood over rising career of Mohammed Rafi.

Besides these songs, there is another song "Kabhi Aankhon Mein Teri" sung by the four sisters Lata Mangeshkar, Asha Bhosle, Usha Mangeshkar and Meena Mangeshkar was neither filmed nor released on disc. Arguably, it might be the only song sung by all the Mangeshkar sisters.

 The lyrics of song 'Phir wohi sham, wohi gham, wohi tanhai' are very similar to the lyrics of song 'Phir wohi Chand, wohi hum, wohi tanhai' from 1957 movie Baarish, music & sung by C. Ramchandra.

References

External links

1964 films
Films set in the Mughal Empire
1960s Hindi-language films
Films scored by Madan Mohan
Cultural depictions of Shah Jahan
1960s historical romance films
Indian historical romance films
1964 directorial debut films